Almo may refer to:

Almo (god), a river deity from Roman mythology
Almo, the ancient name for the River Almone near Rome (whence the name of the above deity)
Almo, Idaho, a town in the United States
Almo, Kentucky, a town in the United States
Almo Sounds, a record label
Almo and Coco, two fictional characters from the manga and video game series Galaxy Angel
Alexander Mogilny, ice hockey player
Arms-length management organisation